This is a list of points scoring systems used to determine the outcome of the ACCR Championships since 1909.  The Championships are awarded each year to the driver who accumulate the most championship points over the course of the Championship season.

Mileage bases points scoring systems

AAA Championships 1909–1929
 Between 1909 and 1929, the Championship points were awarded to the first ten drivers. There were only points for ranks in races, no bonus points. The points system was based on mileage factor. The winner received 2 points per mile. The points system from 1920 was retroactively applied to the past season from 1909 to 1919 with the exception of 1916.
 Drivers had to be running at the finish to score points. Points scored by drivers sharing a ride were split according to percentage of race driven. Starters were not allowed to score points as relief drivers (except 1920), if a race starter finished the race in another car in a points-scoring position those points were not awarded.

AAA Championship 1916
 This is the first points system used since the first running of the Indianapolis 500. The championship points were awarded to the first ten drivers. There were only points for ranks in races, no bonus points. The points system was based in general on race distance but not on mileage factor.
 Drivers had to be running at the finish to score points. Points were moved to the next eligible driver is a finisher completed fewer laps than a non-finisher. Points scored by drivers sharing a ride were split according to percentage of race driven. Starters were not allowed to score points as relief drivers, if a race starter finished the race in another car in a points-scoring position those points were not awarded.

AAA Championships 1930–1936
 Between 1930 and 1936, the Championship points were awarded to the first ten drivers. There were only points for ranks in races, no bonus points. The points system was based on mileage factor. The winner receive 1.2 points per mile. The points gaps between the ranks were also changed from a relatively arbitrary scheme to a uniform allocation.
 Drivers had to be running at the finish to score points. Points scored by drivers sharing a ride were split according to percentage of race driven. Starters were not allowed to score points as relief drivers, if a race starter finished the race in another car in a points-scoring position those points were not awarded.

AAA Championships 1937–1941
 Between 1937 and 1941, the Championship points were awarded to the first twelve drivers. There were only points for ranks in races, no bonus points. The points system was based on mileage factor. The winner received 2 points per mile.
 Drivers had to complete 50% of the race distance to score points. Points scored by drivers sharing a ride were split according to percentage of race driven. Starters were not allowed to score points as relief drivers, if a race starter finished the race in another car in a points-scoring position those points were not awarded.

AAA Championships 1946–1955 and USAC Championships 1956–1977
 Between 1946 and 1977, AAA and USAC awarded the Championship points to the first twelve drivers. There were only points for ranks in races, no bonus points. The points system was based on mileage factor. The winner received 2 points per mile. This is the most common points system in IndyCar, used over 3 decades of racing.
 Points scored by drivers sharing a ride were split according to percentage of race driven. Drivers who started in one car were allowed to score points in another as a relief driver.

USAC/CART Championships 1978–1980
 One year before the split with CART, the USAC  extended their points scoring system to award points to all race entries. CART continued to use this modified USAC points scoring system in the following seasons (1979 and 1980).
 There were only points for ranks in races, no bonus points. The points system based on a mileage factor, the winner receiving 2 points per mile.
 Points scored by drivers sharing a ride were split according to percentage of race driven. Drivers who started in one car were allowed to score points in another as a relief driver.

USAC Gold Crown Championship 1981–1995
 After split with CART, the USAC continued to use their points system to award championship points for their own championship named "Gold Crown". They used the 200 mile points scheme for 100 mile dirt races and the 500 mile points scheme for the Indy 500.

CART Championships 1981 and 1982
 For the seasons 1981 and 1982 CART continued to use the USAC points scoring system. But they divided the points by 10, so the winner received only 0.2 points per mile.
 For the first time, there were bonus points. The driver with the fastest qualifying lap, usually on pole position, and the driver with the most laps led received additional to their rank points a bonus. Bonus points multiplied by mileage factor the same as race points.
 In 1982, CART awarded 300 mile points also for 400- and 500-mile races and didn't use the 400- and 500-mile pattern.

Equal points per race

Ranking points 

 Beginning with 1983, CART used their own scoring system. As previously, only the first twelve ranks got points. All races got the same number of points, based on the 100 mile points scheme from USAC divided by 10.
 After the CART has been converted in 2004 into the new Champ Car World Series, a new points system was also introduced. The first 20 ranks were given points. The points scoring system is similar to the original CART points scoring system.
 Although the Indy Racing League commissioned the USAC to perform the races, the old USAC points system was not reused. Instead, the IRL used its own simple points scoring system for all races, regardless of their distance. The first 33 ranks in race got points, starting with 2 points for position 33. Between the winner and the second place was a 2-point gap, between all other ranks a 1-point gap.
 In the 1996 season, there was a multiplier for awarding points in race two (Phoenix) and race three (Indianapolis). Drivers were credited with overall points multiplied by the number of races they had competed in. For example, Scott Sharp had scored a sum of 82 points in the first three race, so he got 246 championship points (82 multiplied with 3) at the end of season.
 In the 1997 season, there wasn't a multiplier, but they awarded additional 1 point for ranks 34 and 35 because of the extended 1997 Indy 500 entry list.
 After taking over the driving operation from the USAC in 1998, the IRL also changed its points system. All participants of a race were eligible to get championship points, even non-starters received points starting in 1999. The points scoring system applies to all races, regardless of their length or importance.
 In 2004, the IRL modified their points scoring system again. The ranks from 18 to 24 received the same number of 12 points instead of a decreasing score, the ranks 25 to 33 received 10 points. The change was made because this point structure is easier to divide by 2 without getting 0.5 points. This is a consequence of the introduction of shorter twin races, in which only half the number of points was awarded.
 Non-starters received full race points in 2004 and 2005, and half race points beginning with 2006.
 In 2013, the ICS modified the points awarded to the ranks 19–25. It essentially corresponds to the decreasing points scheme of 2003. This system is still in use.

Bonus points

Special Events

Indy qualifying and other qualifying races 
 Starting with the 2010 season, IndyCar introduced a points scoring system for the Indy 500 qualification. As a result, no additional bonus point for the pole position is awarded during this race.
 In 2013, there was a qualifying race in Iowa instead of qualifying practice. For this race, they awarded nine points down to one point for the first twelve finishers. 
 In 2014 points were awarded on both Indy qualifying days: on Saturday points were awarded to all the 33 drivers, on Sunday only the Fast Nine Qualifiers got points.
 In 2015 no points were awarded due to last minute changes on the qualifying rules.

Twin races with half points 
 In 2011, the race on Texas Motor Speedway was divided into two short races. Rounded half points were awarded for both races.

Double point events 
 From 2014–2022, double points were awarded for the Indianapolis 500.
 In 2014, double points were awarded for all 500-mile events — the Indianapolis 500, as well as events held at Pocono and Fontana.
 From 2015–2019, double points were awarded for the season finale, regardless of race length or type of track.

See also 
 List of NASCAR points scoring systems
 List of Formula One World Championship points scoring systems
 List of FIM World Championship points scoring systems
 Automobile Racing Club of America#Points scoring system
 NZ Touring Cars Championship#Scoring system

References

External links
 
 

Points scoring systems